The Orion is a Medium-altitude long-endurance unmanned aerial vehicle (UAV) developed by Aurora Flight Sciences.

Development
Work on the Orion began in 2006, when the U.S. Army funded it as a hydrogen-fuelled “high-altitude, long-loiter” (HALL) UAV.  Originally, it was conceived as a single-engine, hydrogen-fueled, high-altitude unmanned aircraft intended to carry a  payload to  having a  gross weight; similar aircraft included the AeroVironment Global Observer and Boeing Phantom Eye.

Aurora was selected by the Air Force Research Laboratory (AFRL) in 2007 for the Ultra Long Endurance study contract to look at fixed-wing alternatives to the Blue Devil 2 and Long Endurance Multi-Intelligence Vehicle (LEMV) surveillance airships then being explored (both ultimately cancelled) and push beyond the endurance limits of the MQ-1 Predator and RQ-4 Global Hawk; they submitted an unsolicited proposal to the AFRL for the Orion, powered by conventional engines, in 2008.

The company won a joint-capability technology demonstration contract to build the Orion in 2009, which led to a contract for the Medium-Altitude Global Intelligence, surveillance, reconnaissance and Communications relay (Magic) joint concept technology demonstration (JCTD) in 2010. The first demonstrator was rolled out on 22 November 2010, 88 days after the contract award. In 2011, the program was transferred to the Air Force's Big Safari office.

Flight testing
The first flight was expected by August 2011, but progress was limited by funding.

Upon landing, it had  of fuel remaining, enough to fly for an additional 37 hours, but endurance was limited by the window of availability of the range for testing; four pilots rotated over the course of the flight.  The December flight was the 18th for the Orion, logging 158 total flight hours.    Aurora hoped the flight would convince the Air Force to procure the Orion for persistent surveillance, and the company looked at several other roles including a communications relay and to compete against the MQ-4C Triton naval recon UAV.

After five years of development and completing its flight demonstration program, by September 2015 the aircraft was relegated to a company hangar with the Air Force deciding not to buy it.  Several reasons were given to explain this, including budget problems, a 40 m (132 ft) wingspan that cannot fit in many existing Air Force hangars, less speed, payload, and weapons capacity compared to the MQ-9 Reaper, and primarily the lack of an operational requirement for a multi-day, long-endurance unmanned aircraft.  Aurora is looking internationally to try to bring the Orion into service for missions like long-range surveillance and maritime patrol.

The company is trying to raise money from private equity sources to build a system of three Orions to be leased to customers.  Even though interest might not be in buying them, flight time could be made available for rent to users and combatant commanders on a fee-for-service basis with services provided; this has been done by the U.S. Special Operations Command (SOCOM), buying ISR services from Insitu for much smaller ScanEagle drones flown by contractors. By September 2016, the Orion was being taken out of storage to fly again.

A plan was approved by the company to build one three-vehicle system and offer the capability to the military as a contractor-owned or operated ISR service. The new Block 1 design features a few exterior changes, such as a slightly smaller tailplane surface, as well as changes to other structures and systems to offer by late 2019. A series of demonstrations are planned with the U.S. Coast Guard to experiment with surveillance missions over maritime borders.

Design
The revolutionary aspect of the aircraft is meant to be its time on station cost, planned to be only 20 percent the cost per hour compared to current aerial surveillance aircraft like the Predator, MQ-9 Reaper, and MC-12W Liberty through efficient aerodynamics and propulsion, lightweight airframe, reliable systems, autonomous operation, and requiring fewer takeoffs and landings.

It has the capacity to carry  of sensors and weapons spread through the airframe, able to support  in the nose,  in the aft fuselage, and  under the wings. The base sensor is the Raytheon MTS-B electro-optical/infrared turret, but options can include a ground moving target indication (GMTI) radar under the nose, a multi-camera wide-area surveillance sensor in the aft bay, and external fuel tanks and Hellfire missiles under the wings.

Its wingspan is only slightly longer than the Global Hawk's, made of a long-span, one-piece, low-drag, light weight composite wing from tip-to-tip, which reduces weight and cost but prevents it from being disassembled and airlifted to another location. Propulsion comes from a pair of Austro Engine AE300 diesel engines rather than more expensive and less fuel efficient gas turbines. Although it is designed to fly for five days carrying standard payload weight, it could fly for a week with a lighter payload.

Specifications

See also
AeroVironment Global Observer
Boeing Phantom Eye
MQ-9 Reaper
RQ-4 Global Hawk
Orion (Russian UCAV)

References

External links
Orion to challenge with 'extreme persistence' - Flight International
Orion - Aurora Flight Sciences

Unmanned aerial vehicles of the United States
Medium-altitude long-endurance unmanned aerial vehicles
Aurora Flight Sciences aircraft
Aircraft first flown in 2013
Twin-engined turboprop aircraft
High-wing aircraft